An industrial piercing (North America), also known as a scaffold piercing (UK/Ireland) or construction piercing, is any ear piercing that consists of two pierced holes connected with a single piece of jewelry. These piercings typically consist of a double perforation of the upper ear cartilage specifically. Two piercings must be made: one is fairly close to the head (known as a forward-helix piercing), while the second one is further down the helix on the opposite side of the ear. Industrial piercings that are vertical are also known as a suicide industrial.

History 
Industrial piercings first appeared in the early 1990s when they were first invented by Erik Dakota along with the Daith piercing and Rook piercing. The first reference to the industrial piercing was in a 1992 edition of Body Play magazine, which referred to this piercing as the “industrial ear project."

Since its introduction, the industrial piercing has become fairly popular among people of all backgrounds since the various styles of industrial jewelry available allows these piercings to be customized to the wearer's preferences. This type of piercing is even popular among celebrities such as Kylie Jenner, Ashley Tisdale, and Miley Cyrus.

Procedure 
Industrial piercings should always be done by a licensed professional with proper anatomical, procedural, and technical knowledge in a sterilized area.

Industrial piercings require two piercings to be made with a piercing needle since the piercings must be precisely aligned to be properly connected with a single piece of jewelry like the barbell jewelry. Piercing guns should never be used for an industrial piercing because they are designed for lobe piercings, not cartilage ones. Additionally, piercing needles are designed for single-use, meaning they have less bacteria, thus decreasing risk for infection.</ref>

The barbell jewelry worn with industrials are usually 14G, but may also be 16G. One of the piercings, the forward-helix piercing, is made closer to the head, while the second piercing, the outer-helix piercing, is made on the opposite side of the ear. While barbell jewelry is typically worn during the healing period to maintain piercing alignment, a pair of captive bead rings may be used as an alternative. Using captive bead rings may result in faster recovery times at the risk of the piercings becoming misaligned.

Aftercare 
The recovery period for industrial piercings is anywhere between six months and a year. Fresh industrial piercings should only be touched when they are being cleaned. When getting a fresh industrial piercing, it is important to not remove the jewelry as this will give the piercings a chance to be exposed to bacteria and close (this includes replacing the jewelry before the piercings properly heal). The piercings should be cleaned regularly to avoid dirt from accumulating, which would increase risk for infection. There are multiple ways to care for industrial piercings, with two being the most common methods. Piercers will typically recommend a particular method to use.

The first method is to use a pre-made saline solution at least twice a day. This method requires soaking a clean cloth with the solution and gently wiping each side of the barbell jewelry. Piercing professionals recommend against using cloths for this method as they may carry bacteria and get caught on the jewelry, thus irritating the piercing. It is important to clean the piercing sites on both sides of the ear repeatedly until the piercing holes are completely clean and crust free.

The second most popular method for cleaning industrial piercings is quite similar to the saline solution method, but requires a DIY sea salt solution. This solution requires a mixture of sea salt and warm water. Professionals recommend mixing one ounce of sea salt into eight ounces of warm water until it completely dissolves. Once this mixture is ready, it must be applied to a clean cloth before gently wiping the piercing sites around the barbell jewelry.

Other tips for industrial piercing aftercare include:

- Wear earphones instead of headphones to avoid applying unnecessary pressure on the piercings

- Avoid sleeping on the recently pierced ear as this will also apply unnecessary pressure. It is recommended to not get both ears pierced at the same time.

References

Ear piercing